Jeffrey Grayshon MBE (4 March 1949 – 21 March 2021) was an English professional rugby league footballer who played in the 1970s, 1980s and 1990s, and coached in the 1990s. Grayshon continued playing until he was 45 for Batley before taking over as coach at Batley. Jeff's biography "The Warrior: Jeff Grayshon MBE" was written by Maurice Bamford.

Playing career

International honours
Jeff Grayshon won caps for England while at Dewsbury in the 1975 Rugby League World Cup against Wales, France, New Zealand, and Australia, in 1977 against Wales, while at Bradford Northern in 1979 against Wales, and France, in 1980 against Wales (sub), and France, in 1981 against Wales, and won caps for Great Britain while at Bradford Northern in 1979 against Australia (2 matches), and New Zealand (3 matches), in 1980 against New Zealand (2 matches), in 1981 against France (2 matches), in 1982 against Australia (2 matches), while at Leeds in 1985 against New Zealand (2 matches).

Championship final appearances
Jeff Grayshon played left- in Dewsbury's 22–13 victory over Leeds in the Championship Final during the 1972–73 season at Odsal Stadium, Bradford on Saturday 19 May 1973.

County Cup Final appearances
Jeff Grayshon played left- in Dewsbury's 9–36 defeat by Leeds in the 1972–73 Yorkshire Cup Final  at Odsal Stadium, Bradford on Saturday 7 October 1972, played left- in Bradford Northern's 5–10 defeat by Castleford in the 1981–82 Yorkshire Cup  Final  at Headingley Rugby Stadium, Leeds on Saturday 3 October 1981, played left- in the 7–18 defeat by Hull F.C. in the 1982–83 Yorkshire Cup Final  at Elland Road, Leeds on Saturday 2 October 1982, played left- (replaced by interchange/substitute David Hobbs) in the 12–12 draw with Castleford in the 1987–88 Yorkshire Cup Final  at Headingley on Saturday 17 October 1987 (he did not play in the replay), and played left- in Featherstone Rovers' 14–20 defeat by Bradford Northern in the 1989–90 Yorkshire Cup Final Headingley on Sunday 5 November 1989.

BBC2 Floodlit Trophy Final appearances
Jeff Grayshon played  in Dewsbury's 2–22 defeat by St. Helens in the 1975 BBC2 Floodlit Trophy Final  at Knowsley Road, St. Helens on Tuesday 16 December 1975.

John Player Trophy Final appearances
Jeff Grayshon played left- in Bradford Northern's 6–0 victory over Widnes in the 1979–80 John Player Trophy Final at Headingley on Saturday 5 January 1980.

Genealogical information
Jeff Grayshon is the father of the rugby league footballer Paul Grayshon who played in the 1980s and 1990s for Featherstone Rovers and Bradford Northern. Jeff played until he was 45, so long that he actually played against his son.

References

1949 births
2021 deaths
Batley Bulldogs coaches
Batley Bulldogs players
Bradford Bulls players
Cronulla-Sutherland Sharks players
Dewsbury Rams coaches
Dewsbury Rams players
England national rugby league team players
English rugby league coaches
English rugby league players
Featherstone Rovers players
Great Britain national rugby league team captains
Great Britain national rugby league team players
Leeds Rhinos players
Members of the Order of the British Empire
Rugby league fullbacks
Rugby league locks
Rugby league players from Dewsbury
Rugby league props
Rugby league second-rows
Yorkshire rugby league team players